WNSH-LD (channel 9) is a low-power television station located in and licensed to Nashville, Tennessee, United States. Owned and operated by Marquee Broadcasting, the station is affiliated with The Country Network. The station's transmitter is located at the intersection of Cowan and Jefferson Streets in downtown Nashville near an interchange with Interstate 24 (I-24).

History 
The station's construction permit was issued under the callsign W36EW-D on November 7, 2012, to Landover 2, LLC. On May 11, 2021, the station was sold to LowCountry 34 Media, LLC., presided by Jeff Winemiller.The new owner reallocated the station to VHF channel 9, and changed its callsign to W09DM-D. The station signed on the air on October 16, 2021, with religious programming on two subchannels. 

In December 2021, the station was sold to its current owner Marquee Broadcasting; the sale was finalized in March 2022. In April 2022, the station changed the callsign to the current WNSH-LD.

Technical information

Subchannels

References

External links

NSH-LD 
Television channels and stations established in 2021
2021 establishments in Tennessee 
Religious television stations in the United States
Marquee Broadcasting